Francisco Segarra Simón (born 27 February 1976 in Granollers, Barcelona) is a vision impaired S12 swimmer from Spain.  He competed at the 1996 Summer Paralympics, winning a pair of silver medals in the 400 meter freestyle race and the 100 meter backstroke race. He raced at the 2000 Summer Paralympics, earning a pair of bronze medals in the 4 x 100 meter relay medley 49 points race and the 100 meter backstroke race.

References

External links 
 
 

1976 births
Living people
Spanish male backstroke swimmers
Spanish male freestyle swimmers
Paralympic swimmers of Spain
Paralympic silver medalists for Spain
Paralympic bronze medalists for Spain
Paralympic medalists in swimming
Swimmers at the 1996 Summer Paralympics
Swimmers at the 2000 Summer Paralympics
Medalists at the 1996 Summer Paralympics
Medalists at the 2000 Summer Paralympics
Swimmers from Barcelona
Sportspeople from Granollers
S12-classified Paralympic swimmers